{{DISPLAYTITLE:C10H13NO2}}
The molecular formula C10H13NO2 (molar mass : 179.21 g/mol, exact mass : 179.094629) may refer to:

 ALPHA (psychedelic)
 Fusaric acid
 Homarylamine (methylenedioxymethylphenethylamine)
 2,3-Methylenedioxyamphetamine (2,3-MDA)
 3,4-Methylenedioxyamphetamine (MDA or 3,4-MDA)
 Phenacetin, an analgesic
 Phenibut
 Phenprobamate, a muscle relaxant
 Risocaine